Economic security or financial security is the condition of having stable income or other resources to support a standard of living now and in the foreseeable future. It includes:
 probable continued solvency
 predictability of the future cash flow of a person or other economic entity, such as a country
 employment security or job security

Financial security more often refers to individual and family money management and savings. Economic security tends to include the broader effect of a society's production levels and monetary support for non-working citizens.

Components of individual economic security
In the United States, children's economic security is indicated by the income level and employment security of their families or organizations. Economic security of people over 50 years old is based on Social Security benefits, pensions and savings, earnings and employment, and health insurance coverage.

Arizona 
In 1972, the state legislature of Arizona formed a Department of Economic Security with a mission to promote "the safety, well-being, and self sufficiency of children, adults, and families". This department combines state government activities previously managed by the Employment Security Commission, the State Department of Public Welfare, the Division of Vocational Rehabilitation, the State Office of Economic Opportunity, the Apprenticeship Council, and the State Office of Manpower Planning. The State Department of Mental Retardation (renamed the Division of Developmental Disabilities, House Bill 2213) joined the Department in 1974 . The purpose in creating the Department was to provide an integration of direct services to people in such a way as to reduce duplication of administrative efforts, services and expenditures. Family Connections became a part of the Department in January 2007.

Minnesota 
The Minnesota Department of Economic Security was formed in 1977 from the departments of Employment Services and Vocational Rehabilitation, the Governor's Manpower Office, and the Economic Opportunity Office, which administered anti-poverty programs.  In 1985, State Services for the Blind was included in this department. In 2003, the Minnesota Department of Economic Security and Minnesota Department of Trade and Economic Development were merged to form The Minnesota Department of Employment and Economic Development.

National economic security 
In the context of domestic politics and international relations, national economic security is the ability of a country to follow its choice of policies to develop the national economy in the manner desired. Historically, conquest of nations have made conquerors rich through plunder, access to new resources and enlarged trade through controlling of the economies of conquered nations. Today's complex system of international trade is characterized by multi-national agreements and mutual inter-dependence. Availability of natural resources and capacity for production and distribution are essential under this system, leading many experts to consider economic security to be as important a part of national security as military policy.

Economic security has been proposed as a key determinant of international relations, particularly in the geopolitics of petroleum in American foreign policy after 1973 oil crisis and September 11, 2001.

In Canada, threats to the country's overall economic security are considered economic espionage, which is "illegal, clandestine or coercive activity by a foreign government in order to gain unauthorized access to economic intelligence, such as proprietary information or technology, for economic advantage."

In January 2021, the United States Department of Homeland Security (DHS) issued Strategic Action Plan to Counter the Threat Posed by China.

In October 2021 in Japan, prime minister Fumio Kishida created the first-ever ministerial post for economic security.
And in April 2022, Japan's National Diet passed an economic security bill aimed at guarding technology and reinforcing critical supply chains, while also imposing tighter oversight of Japanese firms working in sensitive sectors or critical infrastructure.
Measures in the legislation, which is primarily aimed at warding off risks from China, will be implemented over two years once it is enacted, according to the bill.

In March 2023, Japan and Germany agreed to strengthen cooperation on economic security in the aftermath of tensions over global supply chains and the economic impact of the war in Ukraine. In the first high-ministerial government consultations held between the two countries, German Chancellor Olaf Scholz reached out to Tokyo to seek to reduce Germany's dependence on China for imports of raw materials.

Other
It is widely believed that there is a tradeoff between economic security and economic opportunity.

See also 
Individual economic security
 Citizen's dividend
 Financial intelligence
 Social credit
 Social dividend
 Social safety net
 Universal basic income

National economic security
 Digital supply chain security
 Dual-use technology
 Economic warfare
 2020–present global chip shortage

Notes and references

Personal finance